Sandringham railway station is the terminus of the suburban electrified Sandringham line in Victoria, Australia. It serves the south-eastern Melbourne suburb of Sandringham, and it opened on 2 September 1887.

A signal box is located at the Up (Flinders Street) end of the station, whilst a stabling yard is located directly opposite to the station, stabling up to four trains overnight.

History

Sandringham station opened on 2 September 1887, when the railway line from Brighton Beach was extended. Like the suburb itself, the station was named after Sandringham House, which was inspired by landowner and parliamentarian Charles H. Jones, a member of the Victorian Legislative Assembly between 1864-1871 and 1886-1889.

A tram service, operated by the Victorian Railways, operated from Sandringham to Black Rock from 1919 until 1956. In 1957, the station was closed to goods traffic.

In 1967, boom barriers replaced interlocked gates at the Abbott Street level crossing, located at the Up end of the station. On 16 January 1968, a collision involving two Tait train sets occurred between Hampton and Sandringham.

On 17 June 1988, No. 5 road was abolished, leaving the platform road and three siding roads. On 30 October 1995, Sandringham was upgraded to a Premium Station.

On 30 August 2002, Comeng motor carriage 500M was destroyed by fire as it travelled between Hampton and Sandringham.

On 9 March 2011, a Siemens Nexas train overshot one of the sidings and crashed into a branch of the Bendigo Bank.

Platforms and services

Sandringham has one platform. It is serviced by Metro Trains' Sandringham line services.

Platform 1:
  all stations services to Flinders Street

Transport links

Kinetic Melbourne operates three routes via Sandringham station, under contract to Public Transport Victoria:
 : Westfield Southland – St Kilda station
 : Westfield Southland – St Kilda station
 : Westfield Southland – St Kilda station

Ventura Bus Lines operates one route to and from Sandringham station, under contract to Public Transport Victoria:
 : to Chadstone Shopping Centre

References

External links
 Melway map at street-directory.com.au

Premium Melbourne railway stations
Railway stations in Melbourne
Railway stations in Australia opened in 1887
Railway stations in the City of Bayside